Obesotoma uchidai is a species of sea snail, a marine gastropod mollusk in the family Mangeliidae.

Description

Distribution
This species occurs in the Sea of Japan.

References

 Habe, T. (1958) The fauna of Akkeshi Bay XXV. Gastropoda. Publications from the Akkeshi Marine Biological Station, Hokkaido University, Sapporo, 8: 1–40.
 Hasegawa, K., Okutani, T. and E. Tsuchida (2000) Family Turridae. In: Okutani, T. (ed.), Marine Mollusks in Japan. Tokai University Press, Tokyo, 619–667 (in Japanese).

External links
  Tucker, J.K. 2004 Catalog of recent and fossil turrids (Mollusca: Gastropoda). Zootaxa 682:1–1295.
 Biolib.cz: Obesotoma uchidai

uchidai
Gastropods described in 1958